Hurricane Ekeka was the second most intense off-season tropical cyclone on record in the northeastern Pacific basin. The first storm of the 1992 Pacific hurricane season, Ekeka developed on January 28 well to the south of Hawaii. It gradually intensified to reach major hurricane status on February 2, although it subsequently began to weaken due to unfavorable high wind shear. It crossed the International Date Line as a weakened tropical storm, and shortly thereafter degraded to tropical depression status. The storm did not cause any significant damage or deaths.

Meteorological history 

During the El Niño of 1991–92, as typical with other such events, the monsoon trough extended into the central north Pacific Ocean, which is the body of water between the International Date Line and 140°W. At the same time, sea surface temperatures near the equator were anomalously warm, and wind shear values were low. At the end of January, a large area of convection persisted for several days near the north side of the equator. By January 23, several ships reported squalls and strong southwesterly winds in the region. The disturbance organized further as it tracked westward, and on January 28 it developed into Tropical Depression One-C, located a short distance north of Kiritimati and east of Tabuaeran.

With favorable conditions, the depression quickly intensified into a tropical storm; upon doing so, it was named Ekeka by the CPHC, which is Hawaiian for Edgar. Subsequently, it began to weaken due to increased wind shear, and concurrently its forward motion increased as the subtropical ridge strengthened to the north of the hurricane. A large trough in the Westerlies increased the wind shear, which weakened Ekeka to a tropical storm early on February 3. Shortly before that, the JMA assessed the pressure as 985 mbar, which is the lowest known minimum central pressure associated with the storm; the CPHC did not include pressure in their year-end report.

Tropical Storm Ekeka continued weakening, degrading to tropical depression status by February 4. The depression moved quickly through the Marshall Islands, and on February 6 turned to the west-southwest. On February 8, the JMA declared Ekeka dissipated; however, the JTWC continued monitoring the system, with Ekeka passing over Chuuk as a weak depression.

Impact and records 
No deaths were reported in association with Ekeka. The storm passed through the Marshall Islands without causing significant impact.
While in the central Pacific Ocean, Ekeka became one of only three tropical cyclones on record to be located within the Palmyra Atoll Exclusive Economic Zone; Ekeka was the only hurricane within the area.

Ekeka is most unusual for its formation in January. Tropical cyclones rarely form east of the International Date Line outside of the tropical cyclone season, which starts May 15 in the eastern Pacific and June 1 in the central Pacific, and ends on November 30 in both regions. In the official Pacific hurricane database, Ekeka was the second tropical cyclone on record to occur in January or February within the Pacific Ocean east of the International Date Line, after Tropical Storm Winona of 1989. It is third earliest cyclone on record within the basin, behind Hurricane Pali of 2016, and the aforementioned Winona.

See also 

 Tropical cyclones in 1992
 List of Category 3 Pacific hurricanes
 List of off-season Pacific hurricanes
 List of Pacific hurricanes
 List of Equatorial tropical cyclones

References 

1992 Pacific hurricane season
1992 Pacific typhoon season
Category 3 Pacific hurricanes
Off-season Eastern Pacific tropical cyclones
Western Pacific severe tropical storms